This article refers to crime in the U.S. state of Idaho.

Capital punishment laws 

Capital punishment is applied in this state.

References